Ernesta De Mola, best known as Tina De Mola (28 October 1923 – 18 April 2012), was an Italian actress, singer and television personality.

Life and career
Born in Milan, De Mola was the daughter of a barber. After winning a contest for new voices in 1941, she started her career as singer-actress with several avanspettacolo companies. In 1942, she met Renato Rascel, and soon she became his wife and the primadonna in his revue company. That same year she made her film debut, in Giacomo Gentilomo's Pazzo d'amore. In 1946, De Mola participated to the Miss Italia beauty contest, getting the title of "Miss Sorriso D'Italia". After working on stage with the companies led by Erminio Macario, Ugo Tognazzi and Mario Carotenuto, she successfully toured South America with a program of Italian music. From 1955 onwards, she also became a central figure in the early Italian television, as a hostess and soubrette in a number of variety shows. De Mola and Rascel obtained the Roman Rota's annulment of marriage in 1963, and De Mola remarried in 1971.

Selected filmography
 Pazzo d'amore (1942)
 The Merry Widower (1950)
 I pinguini ci guardano (1956)
 March's Child (1957)
 La sceriffa (1959)

References

External links
 

1923 births
2012 deaths
Actresses from Milan
20th-century Italian actresses
Italian film actresses
Italian stage actresses
Italian pop singers
20th-century Italian women singers
Italian women television presenters
Mass media people from Milan